Mbaitoli is a Local Government Area of Imo State, Nigeria. Its headquarters are in the town of Nwaorieubi (or Nworieubi). It has an area of 204 km² and a population of 327,000. The postal code of the area is 461. Mbaitoli is divided into 9 autonomous communities with 12 INEC wards. The principal occupations of these communities are farming and handicrafts.

Culture and festivals 
Most of its festivals like the Mmanwu festival and Okorosha festival are held during the December holidays.

Ekeleke Dancing Group which is performed by Umuomezume kindred Ofekata, Orodo on every Eke day starting from April to first week of June.

Communities and villages

Notable people 
 Kiliwi Nwachukwu — Nigerian fighter

References

Local Government Areas in Imo State
Local Government Areas in Igboland